The 2016 season was Lancashire Thunder's first season, in which they competed in the Women's Cricket Super League, a Twenty20 competition. The side finished bottom of the group stage, winning one of their five matches.

The side was partnered with Lancashire County Cricket Club, and played their home matches at Old Trafford and Stanley Park. They were coached by Stephen Titchard and captained by overseas player Amy Satterthwaite.

Squad
Lancashire Thunder's 14-player squad is listed below. The squad originally contained 15 players, but Sarah Taylor, who was also meant to captain the side, withdrew due to anxiety issues. Jess Jonassen and Sarah Coyte were initially signed as overseas players, but were replaced by Hayley Matthews and Amy Satterthwaite, respectively, with Satterthwaite also replacing Taylor as captain. Age given is at the start of Lancashire Thunder's first match of the season (31 July 2016).

Women's Cricket Super League

Season standings

 Advanced to the Final.
 Advanced to the Semi-final.

League stage

Statistics

Batting

Bowling

Fielding

Wicket-keeping

References

Lancashire Thunder seasons
2016 in English women's cricket